First Lady is a 2022 Philippine television drama romance comedy series broadcast by GMA Network. The series is the direct continuation of the television series First Yaya. Directed by L.A. Madridejos, it stars Sanya Lopez in the title role. It premiered on February 14, 2022 on the network's Telebabad line up replacing I Left My Heart in Sorsogon. The series concluded on July 1, 2022 with a total of 97 episodes. It was replaced by Lolong in its timeslot.

Cast and characters

Lead cast
 Sanya Lopez as Melody Reyes-Acosta 

Supporting cast
 Gabby Concepcion as Glenn Francisco W. Acosta
 Alice Dixson as Ingrid Domingo
 Rocco Nacino as Moises Valentin
 Pancho Magno as Conrad Enriquez
 Pilar Pilapil as Blesilda Wenceslao-Acosta
 Cassy Legaspi as Janina "Nina" Valdez Acosta
 Patricia Coma as Nicolette "Nicole" Domingo-Acosta 
 Clarence Delgado as Nathaniel "Nathan" Valdez Acosta
 Boboy Garovillo as Florencio Reyes
 Sandy Andolong as Edna Reyes
 Analyn Barro as Gemrose Reyes-Agcaoili
 Jerick Dolormente as Lloyd Reyes
 Isabel Rivas as Allegra Trinidad
 Francine Prieto as Soledad Cortez
 Samantha Lopez as Ambrocia Bolivar
 Thou Reyes as Yessey Reyes
 Maxine Medina as Lorraine Prado-Reyes
 Joaquin Domagoso as Jonas Clarito
 Kakai Bautista as Pepita San Jose
 Cai Cortez as Norma Robles
 Thia Thomalla as Valerie "Val" Cañete
 Jon Lucas as Titus de Villa
 Glenda Garcia as Marnie Tupaz
 Anjo Damiles as Jasper Agcaoili
 Kiel Rodriguez as Paul Librada
 Muriel Lomadilla as Beverly "Bevs" Oliveros
 Divine Aucina as Bella Llamanzares
 Shyr Valdez as Sioning Lagman

Guest cast
 Shannelle Agustin as Max
 Jhoana Marie Tan as Maila
 John Feir as Teddy
 Dennis Marasigan as Ezekiel
 Jestoni Alarcon as Anastacio
 Glaiza de Castro as Ciara P. Reyna
 Rabiya Mateo as Ashanti P.
 Carla Abellana as Andrea Salcedo
 Sam Nielsen as young Ingrid

Episodes
</onlyinclude>

References

External links
 
 

2022 Philippine television series debuts
2022 Philippine television series endings
Filipino-language television shows
GMA Network drama series
Philippine political television series
Television shows set in the Philippines